Susan Jacqueline Metcalfe (born 25 May 1965) is an English former cricketer who played as a right-handed batter and right-arm medium bowler. She appeared in 13 Test matches and 36 One Day Internationals for England between 1984 and 1998. She played domestic cricket for Yorkshire.

References

External links
 

1965 births
Living people
England women Test cricketers
England women One Day International cricketers
Yorkshire women cricketers